Amy Everson is an American artist, actor and screenwriter. Everson re-appropriates objects from pop culture and presents them in humorous or disturbing ways. Many pieces are made of felt. She is also known for creating cloth masks and body suits often with exaggerated genitalia. Her work has been interpreted a critique of rape culture.

Film Work
Everson co-wrote and starred in Felt directed by Jason Banker. Everson's work in Felt earned her the 2014 Fantastic Fest "Next Wave" Spotlight Award for Best Actress, and the Nashville Film Festival Graveyard Shift Competition Award for Best Actress.

Everson was the costume and makeup art director for the musical group Modest Mouse's "Lampshades on Fire" video  as well as the art and costume director for their second video, “The Ground Walks with Time in a Box.”

Filmography

Awards and nominations

References

External links 
 Amy Everson website
 Art Directing Duo

American women artists
Living people
Year of birth missing (living people)
Place of birth missing (living people)
21st-century American women